Nyaungbin may refer to the following places in Burma:

Nyaungbin, Kawa, a village in Bago Region, Myanmar
Nyaungbintha, Mohnyin